Columbia is a city on the James River in Brown County, South Dakota, United States. The population was 160 at the 2020 census.

History
An early variant name was Allentown. The city derives its present name from the song "Hail, Columbia".

Geography
Columbia is located at  (45.611364, -98.311929).

Columbia has been assigned the ZIP code 57433 and the FIPS place code 13420.

Climate

Demographics

2010 census
As of the census of 2010, there were 136 people, 70 households, and 39 families residing in the city. The racial makeup of the city was 98.5% White, 0.7% from other races, and 0.7% from two or more races. Hispanic or Latino of any race were 2.2% of the population.

There were 70 households, of which 17.1% had children under the age of 18 living with them, 47.1% were married couples living together, 8.6% had a female householder with no husband present, and 44.3% were non-families. 40.0% of all households were made up of individuals, and 18.6% had someone living alone who was 65 years of age or older. The average household size was 1.94 and the average family size was 2.59.

The median age in the city was 51 years. 15.4% of residents were under the age of 18; 4.4% were between the ages of 18 and 24; 22% were from 25 to 44; 33.9% were from 45 to 64; and 24.3% were 65 years of age or older. The gender makeup of the city was 51.5% male and 48.5% female.

2000 census
As of the census of 2000, there were 140 people, 65 households, and 39 families residing in the city. The population density was 88.8 people per square mile (34.2/km2). There were 76 housing units at an average density of 48.2 per square mile (18.6/km2). The racial makeup of the city was 98.57% White and 1.43% Native American.

There were 65 households, out of which 26.2% had children under the age of 18 living with them, 50.8% were married couples living together, 7.7% had a female householder with no husband present, and 38.5% were non-families. 36.9% of all households were made up of individuals, and 16.9% had someone living alone who was 65 years of age or older. The average household size was 2.15 and the average family size was 2.80.

In the city, the population was spread out, with 22.1% under the age of 18, 7.9% from 18 to 24, 27.1% from 25 to 44, 25.0% from 45 to 64, and 17.9% who were 65 years of age or older. The median age was 41 years. For every 100 females, there were 91.8 males. For every 100 females age 18 and over, there were 91.2 males.

The median income for a household in the city was $23,125, and the median income for a family was $27,813. Males had a median income of $30,000 versus $21,000 for females. The per capita income for the city was $17,967. There were 10.6% of families and 13.1% of the population living below the poverty line, including 13.8% of under eighteens and 5.9% of those over 64.

Notable person
 Kermit Wahl, Major League Baseball player

See also
 List of cities in South Dakota

References

External links

Cities in Brown County, South Dakota
Cities in South Dakota
Aberdeen, South Dakota micropolitan area
Populated places established in 1885
1885 establishments in Dakota Territory